Yuefan Deng (Y. F. Deng, born December 1962) is a professor at Stony Brook University and is also an affiliated faculty of the Institute of Advanced Computational Sciences at the same university. In addition, he is the Mt. Tai Scholar at the National Supercomputer Center in Jinan, China and this title ended in December, 2017. Yuefan Deng specializes in design and applications of supercomputers. He published widely in physics, applied mathematics, life science and biomedical engineering, in addition to the Biography of C. N. Yang, the Nobel laureate. He has been granted 13 patents by the US Patent and Trademark Office and China's State Intellectual Property Office and most of these patents are related to supercomputer network topologies.

Education 
Yuefan Deng obtained his BS degree, with honors, in physics from Nankai University of China in 1983. In August that year, he entered the Department of Physics of Columbia University through a special scholarship program CUSPEA organized by the Chinese-American Nobel laureate T. D. Lee. He obtained his Ph.D. degree in theoretical physics with a thesis on simulating gauge theory using special-purpose supercomputers supervised by Norman Christ from Columbia University in 1989. He did his postdoctoral training in the Courant Institute of Mathematical Sciences at New York University with James Glimm, during the summer of 1989.

Achievements 
 Co-opted as a member of Mathematics and Physics Committee of China in 2012.
 Supervisor of Winning Team of Asia Student Cluster Challenge 2014. Team: Nanyang Technological University, Singapore
 Supervisor of Winning Team of SC14 Student Cluster Competition 2014. Team: National University of Singapore
 2015 MTI Innovation Gold Award for InfiniCortex Project, Ministry of Trade and Industry, Singapore
 2016 State University of New York Chancellor's Award for Excellence in Teaching

Textbooks 
 Y. Deng, Lectures, Problems and Solutions for Ordinary Differential Equations, published by World Scientific (First Edition: 2015 ; Second Edition: 2018 ). 
 Y. Deng, Applied Parallel Computing, published by World Scientific (2013). .
 Y. Deng and Z. Lou, Calculus IV with Many Examples, published by Copley Custom Textbook/XanEdu (Edition 1:7/2009; Edition 2:1/2011)
 Y. Deng, S. Amir and C. Han, Lectures on Introductory Partial Differential Equations, Methods for Solving Basic PDEs, published by LAP LAMBERT Academic Publishing (2015). .
 Y. Deng (Translator; Original English version by James Glimm) Mathematical science, Technology, and Economic Competitiveness, published by Nankai University Press (1992). .

References

External links
 Y. F. Deng's English Home Page
  www.ams.sunysb.edu/~deng

1962 births
Columbia University alumni
Columbia University faculty
Academic staff of the Hong Kong University of Science and Technology
Living people
Nankai University alumni
New York University faculty
Stony Brook University faculty